The 2003–04 Football League Cup (known as the Carling Cup for sponsorship reasons) was the 44th staging of the Football League Cup, a knockout competition for England's top 92 football clubs. The competition name reflects a sponsorship deal with lager brand Carling.

The competition began in August 2003 and ended with the final on 29 February 2004. The Millennium Stadium in Cardiff hosted the final match, as it had done since 2001 as the reconstruction was still taking place on Wembley Stadium in London.

The winners were Middlesbrough who beat Bolton Wanderers in the final 2-1 and collected their first major piece of silverware in their history and as a result of their victory qualified for European football for the first time. Joseph Desire-Job gave Middlesbrough the lead with just 2 minutes gone and a Bolo Zenden penalty five minutes later doubled their advantage. Kevin Davies pulled a goal back in the 21st minute but Middlesbrough held on. It was to be until 2008 when another English manager won a domestic tournament when Harry Redknapp (then at Portsmouth) lifted the FA Cup.

First round 

1 Score after 90 minutes

Second round 
The 36 winners from the First Round joined 12 of the 20 Premier League clubs not participating in the UEFA Champions League in Round Two.

 The draw was made on 16 August 2003.
 Matches occurred during the week commencing 22 August.
 Extra time played when the scores were level after 90 minutes.

1 Score after 90 minutes

Third round 
Manchester United, Arsenal, Chelsea, Newcastle United, Liverpool, Southampton, Blackburn Rovers and Manchester City joined the 24 winners from the Second Round. Matches were played on the week commencing 27 October 2003

1 Score after 90 minutes

Fourth round 
 The draw was made on 30 November 2003.
 Matches were played in the week commencing 1 December.
 Extra time played when scores level at 90 minutes.

Quarter-finals 
The draw for the quarter-finals was made on 6 December 2003. Matches were played in the week beginning 15 December 2003. The only team from outside the Premier League competing in this round was West Bromwich Albion, who lost 2–0 to Arsenal.

Semi-finals 
The semi-final draw was made on 20 December 2003 Unlike the other rounds, the semi-final ties were played over two legs, with each team playing one leg at home. The ties were played in the weeks beginning 19 January and 26 January 2004, however the second leg of Middlesbrough v Arsenal was not played until 3 February 2004.

First leg

Second leg 

Bolton Wanderers won 5–4 on aggregate.

Middlesbrough won 3–1 on aggregate.

Final 

The 2004 Carling Cup Final was played on 29 February 2004 at the Millennium Stadium, Cardiff. It was contested by Bolton Wanderers and Middlesbrough. Middlesbrough won the match 2-1 and in doing so collected their first major piece of silverware in their history and qualified for the European football in the UEFA Cup for the first time.

See also 
 Football League Cup

External links 

 Official Carling Cup website
 Carling Cup at bbc.co.uk
 Results service at soccerbase.com

EFL Cup seasons
Cup, 2003-04